Negaprion is a genus of requiem sharks in the family Carcharhinidae. It contains the two extant species of lemon sharks: the lemon shark (N. brevirostris) of the Americas, and the sicklefin lemon shark (N. acutidens) of the Indo-Pacific. Both species are large, slow-moving, bulky sharks inhabiting shallow coastal waters, and can be identified by their short, blunt snouts, two dorsal fins of nearly equal size, and uniform yellowish brown or gray coloration.

Species
 Negaprion acutidens (Rüppell, 1837) (sicklefin lemon shark)
 Negaprion brevirostris (Poey, 1868) (lemon shark)
 †Negaprion eurybathrodon (Blake, 1862)

See also
 List of prehistoric cartilaginous fish genera

References

 
Bartonian first appearances
Extant Eocene first appearances
Shark genera
Taxa named by Gilbert Percy Whitley